Josh Tyrangiel is an American journalist. He was previously the deputy managing editor of TIME magazine and an editor at Bloomberg Businessweek. In June 2019, Tyrangiel left the network, following the cancellation of Vice News Tonight.

Early life and education
Josh Tyrangiel was born on September 25, 1972 and grew up in Baltimore. He has a sister. He graduated high school from the Park School of Baltimore in 1990 where he played on the soccer team and was active in student government. For his senior-year project, he called the Baltimore Orioles and successfully got a position as a member of the grounds crew, where he worked for six months. Tyrangiel attended the University of Pennsylvania as an undergraduate and ran the school's newspaper. He received his master's degree in American Studies from Yale University.

Career
After college, Tyrangiel worked at Vibe and Rolling Stone magazines and produced the news at MTV.

In 1999, he joined TIME as a staff writer and music critic. He also served as the magazine's London correspondent and national editor. In 2006, Tyrangiel was promoted to deputy managing editor at TIME.com, as well as tasked with overseeing TIME's Person of the Year franchise.

In journalistic circles, Tyrangiel was presumed to be the successor to Richard Stengel, who was editor of the magazine at that time. Tyrangiel says he wanted the job, but recognized there was competition for the position and that the company may be resistant to his hopes of taking it in a new direction. Norman Pearlstine, who had been the Editor in Chief at Time Inc and was then working as the Chief Content Officer at Bloomberg L.P., invited him to breakfast, and suggested he go to struggling Businessweek following its acquisition by Bloomberg L.P. for “one dollar plus debt." Tyrangiel presented his ideas for the company to Bloomberg and, in November 2009, Tyrangiel was named editor of the magazine. In April 2010, Tyrangiel oversaw the rebranding of BusinessWeek into Bloomberg Businessweek and led the editorial vision of the magazine. Ravi Somaiya with NPR said that "It's hard to understate the degree to which Tyrangiel's nearly six-year tenure...stimulated change at the magazine and challenged the way in which the larger news organization had previously operated." Bloomberg Businessweek won several magazine awards while Tyrangiel served as the editor. In 2011, Adweek named Bloomberg Businessweek the most influential business magazine of the year. In 2012, the magazine won the National Magazine Award for general excellence in general interest magazines. Tyrangiel has also received personal honors for his work at Bloomberg Businessweek. In 2009, Tyrangiel was named to The New York Observer’s list of top insurgents for the upcoming year, and in 2012, Tyrangiel was named editor of the year by Ad Age and was included on Crain's New York Business 40 under 40 list. In November 2013, Tyrangiel was called on to help shape television content for Bloomberg Television. In August 2014, Tyrangiel was promoted to oversee all content on Bloomberg's media platforms. In October 2015, Tyrangiel stepped down as editor of Bloomberg Businessweek.

In 2015, he began negotiations to join Vice, meeting with the program's head Shane Smith. As the Senior Vice President of news, he ran the company's digital news desk. He spearheaded the launch of Vice News Tonight in October 2016. in April 2019, Tyrangiel was included on The Hollywood Reporter's ninth annual list of New York's 35 Most Powerful People in Media and, in his interview, said that he was working on new projects that played to Vice's strengths. In June 2019, however, Tyrangiel and Vice News CEO, Nancy Dubuc, both released statements announcing his departure from Vice at the conclusion of the summer. His departure had something to do with the cancellation of Vice News Tonight.

Notable interviews
Tyrangiel has a number of interviews with celebrities and dignitaries:

Bono*
Kanye West*
Dixie Chicks*
Bruce Springsteen*
Barack Obama
Senator John Kerry
Speaker of the House Dennis Hastert
Supreme Court Justice Stephen Breyer
Yao Ming
Sean Penn
Nicole Kidman
George Clooney
Tim Cook*
LinkedIn CEO Jeff Weiner
Mayor Boris Johnson
Ol' Dirty Bastard*

In addition, Tyrangiel published a review of Michael Jackson's musical legacy on Time.com shortly after the pop star's death.

Note: An asterisk (*) indicates a cover article.

Personal life

Tyrangiel lives in the East Village of New York City with his wife and his two children. Tyrangiel is Jewish.  He is fan of the Baltimore Orioles. His great-uncle, Judah Nadich, was Dwight Eisenhower’s first advisor on Jewish affairs during the Holocaust.

References

External links

Living people
People from the East Village, Manhattan
American male journalists
University of Pennsylvania alumni
Time (magazine) people
Yale Graduate School of Arts and Sciences alumni
Park School of Baltimore alumni
1972 births